Kelarabad (also Romanized as Kelārābād and Kalārābād) is a city and capital of Kelarabad District, Abbasabad County, Mazandaran Province, Iran. In the 2006 census, its population was 5,457, with 1,515 families.

References

Populated places in Abbasabad County
Cities in Mazandaran Province